The 4 × 100 metre mixed freestyle relay competition at the 2019 World Championships was held on 27 July 2019. The event was won by the United States team in a world record time of 3 minutes, 19.40 seconds.

Records
Prior to the competition, the existing world and championship records were as follows.

The following new records were set during this competition.

Results

Heats
The heats were held on at 10:53.

Final
The final was started at 21.47.

References

4 x 100 metre mixed freestyle relay
World